Radusz may refer to the following places:
Radusz, Greater Poland Voivodeship (west-central Poland)
Radusz, Pomeranian Voivodeship (north Poland)
Radusz, West Pomeranian Voivodeship (north-west Poland)